Events in the year 2017 in Latvia.

Incumbents
 President: Raimonds Vējonis
 Prime Minister: Māris Kučinskis

Events
22 July – the Eurovision Choir of the Year 2017 was held in Riga, with Latvia placing third.

Deaths

21 January – Biruta Baumane, painter (born 1922).

10 March – Gido Kokars, conductor (born 1921).

8 August — Pēteris Plakidis, composer (born 1947).

15 August — Gunārs Birkerts, architect (born 1925).

10 September — Konstantins Pupurs, historian, linguist, political scientist and activist (born 1964).

7 December — Žermēna Heine-Vāgnere, operatic soprano (born 1923).

References

 
2010s in Latvia
Years of the 21st century in Latvia
Latvia
Latvia